In four-dimensional geometry, a cantellated 5-cell is a convex uniform 4-polytope, being a cantellation (a 2nd order truncation, up to edge-planing) of the regular 5-cell.

Cantellated 5-cell

The cantellated 5-cell or small rhombated pentachoron is a uniform 4-polytope. It has 30 vertices, 90 edges, 80 faces, and 20 cells. The cells are 5 cuboctahedra, 5 octahedra, and 10 triangular prisms. Each vertex is surrounded by 2 cuboctahedra, 2 triangular prisms, and 1 octahedron; the vertex figure is a nonuniform triangular prism.

Alternate names 
 Cantellated pentachoron 
 Cantellated 4-simplex
 (small) prismatodispentachoron
 Rectified dispentachoron 
 Small rhombated pentachoron (Acronym: Srip) (Jonathan Bowers)

Images

Coordinates 
The Cartesian coordinates of the vertices of the origin-centered cantellated 5-cell having edge length 2 are:

The vertices of the cantellated 5-cell can be most simply positioned in 5-space as permutations of:
 (0,0,1,1,2)

This construction is from the positive orthant facet of the cantellated 5-orthoplex.

Related polytopes 
The convex hull of two cantellated 5-cells in opposite positions is a nonuniform polychoron composed of 100 cells: three kinds of 70 octahedra (10 rectified tetrahedra, 20 triangular antiprisms, 40 triangular antipodiums), 30 tetrahedra (as tetragonal disphenoids), and 60 vertices. Its vertex figure is a shape topologically equivalent to a cube with a triangular prism attached to one of its square faces.

Vertex figure

Cantitruncated 5-cell 

The cantitruncated 5-cell or great rhombated pentachoron is a uniform 4-polytope. It is composed of 60 vertices, 120 edges, 80 faces, and 20 cells. The cells are: 5 truncated octahedra, 10 triangular prisms, and 5 truncated tetrahedra. Each vertex is surrounded by 2 truncated octahedra, one triangular prism, and one truncated tetrahedron.

Alternative names 
 Cantitruncated pentachoron 
 Cantitruncated 4-simplex
 Great prismatodispentachoron
 Truncated dispentachoron 
 Great rhombated pentachoron (Acronym: grip) (Jonathan Bowers)

Images

Cartesian coordinates 

The Cartesian coordinates of an origin-centered cantitruncated 5-cell having edge length 2 are:

These vertices can be more simply constructed on a hyperplane in 5-space, as the permutations of:
 (0,0,1,2,3)

This construction is from the positive orthant facet of the cantitruncated 5-orthoplex.

Related polytopes 
A double symmetry construction can be made by placing truncated tetrahedra on the truncated octahedra, resulting in a nonuniform polychoron with 10 truncated tetrahedra, 20 hexagonal prisms (as ditrigonal trapezoprisms), two kinds of 80 triangular prisms (20 with D3h symmetry and 60 C2v-symmetric wedges), and 30 tetrahedra (as tetragonal disphenoids). Its vertex figure is topologically equivalent to the octahedron.

Vertex figure

Related 4-polytopes 
These polytopes are art of a set of 9 Uniform 4-polytopes constructed from the [3,3,3] Coxeter group.

References 
 H.S.M. Coxeter: 
 H.S.M. Coxeter, Regular Polytopes, 3rd Edition, Dover New York, 1973 
 Kaleidoscopes: Selected Writings of H.S.M. Coxeter, edited by F. Arthur Sherk, Peter McMullen, Anthony C. Thompson, Asia Ivic Weiss, Wiley-Interscience Publication, 1995,  
 (Paper 22) H.S.M. Coxeter, Regular and Semi Regular Polytopes I, [Math. Zeit. 46 (1940) 380-407, MR 2,10]
 (Paper 23) H.S.M. Coxeter, Regular and Semi-Regular Polytopes II, [Math. Zeit. 188 (1985) 559-591]
 (Paper 24) H.S.M. Coxeter, Regular and Semi-Regular Polytopes III, [Math. Zeit. 200 (1988) 3-45]
 Norman Johnson Uniform Polytopes, Manuscript (1991)
 N.W. Johnson: The Theory of Uniform Polytopes and Honeycombs, Ph.D. (1966)
 
  x3o3x3o - srip, x3x3x3o - grip

4-polytopes